The Russian Certificate of Identity is a biometric travel document issued by the  Ministry of Internal Affairs of the Russian Federation to individuals who are not Russian citizens and are about to leave Russia or one of its territories.

Issued to a person who lives in the Russian Federation and whose citizenship of the Russian Federation has been terminated.

In most countries of the world, this document is issued to persons residing on its territory, but according to some criteria, do not meet the acquisition of citizenship (Non-citizens (Latvia), Non-citizens (Estonia), Document of a permanent resident of Brunei not corresponding to the acquisition of citizenship, Bedouins without citizenship of Kuwait, etc. ). On the territory of Russia, this document is issued mainly to Russian citizens who have renounced Russian citizenship. Russian citizens may renounce Russian citizenship for the following reasons:

upon reaching a certain position, the development of social ties, it becomes more profitable for an individual to have no citizenship at all than to have citizenship of the Russian Federation (citizenship of the Russian Federation does not give advantages).
obtaining a residence permit in a foreign state. A number of states give advantages in obtaining citizenship to stateless persons or give it automatically (Brazil).
anti-war (renunciation of US citizenship by Americans - members of the Movement against the Vietnam War) and anti-government position.
increase in the burden and demands on naturalized citizens (naturalized citizens of the Russian Federation, immigrants from Central Asian countries to serve in the army or pay taxes). It is easiest for naturalized citizens to obtain a residence permit for a stateless person and continue to live in Russia (if desired), since confirmation of the possibility of granting another citizenship to the applicant in case of his renunciation of the citizenship of the Russian Federation is not required.

References

International travel documents